Dights Falls is a rapid and weir on the Yarra River in Melbourne, Victoria, just downstream of the junction with the Merri Creek. At this point the river narrows and is constricted between 800,000-year-old volcanic, basaltic lava flow and a much older steep, silurian, sedimentary spur. The north side also contains abundant graptolite fossils in sedimentary sandstone.

History 
Prior to European settlement, the area was occupied by the indigenous Wurundjeri tribe of the Kulin nation. The rock falls would have provided the Aboriginal people with a natural river crossing and place to trap migrating fish. It was also a meeting place for many clans where they would trade, settle disputes and exchange brides.

In January 1803, Charles Grimes, the deputy surveyor-general of New South Wales, was sent to Port Phillip to survey the area. Sailing on the schooner Cumberland, under the command of Acting Lieutenant Charles Robbins, the party entered Port Phillip on 20 January 1803.  Grimes explored the Yarra by boat for several miles until he reached Dights Falls on 8 February. The event is commemorated by a historic marker on a ridge above the falls to the east: "first white men to discover the river Yarra reaching Yarra Falls on 8th February, 1803. Also to make the first crossing near here with the cattle by the first overlanders John Gardiner, Joseph Hawdon and Captain John Hepburn in December 1836".

In 1839, John Dight, a flour miller previously based in Campell Town, New South Wales, purchased a block of land next to the falls and in 1841, built a water-powered mill there. He built a small weir on the natural bar of basalt boulders to regulate water for the water wheel. The property changed hands several times over the decades until the mill was destroyed by fire in the early 1900s. The site remains one of Melbourne's oldest and most significant industrial sites.

The weir was upgraded in 1895 for the Melbourne Flour Milling Company, which had acquired the former Yarra Falls Roller Mill, which were the largest capacity water-power system in Victoria at the time of construction, and technically Victoria's first hydro-electric plant. It underwent reconstruction work in 1918, 1940, and 1967, following damaging floods.

In 1993, Melbourne Water recognised that the weir was a major obstacle to fish migration up the Yarra River, and installed a fish ladder. Subsequent research found it "is not functioning adequately and will require modifications to improve its efficiency and effectiveness". Melbourne Water have undertaken works from the end of 2010 to replace the weir and construct a new fishway to address this issue.

Current usage 
The area can be readily accessed by walkers and cyclists from the Yarra River Trail.

The rapid is often used for canoeing, and has been used many times for the Victorian Canoe Slalom Championships. 

Magpies occupy the area, and it is said that the Collingwood Football Club's use of the magpie mascot was inspired by the magpies at Dights Falls.

External links
About the falls.
Information from Parks Victoria.

References

Yarra River
Heritage sites in Melbourne
City of Yarra
City of Boroondara
Weirs